Wu Chun-feng (born 2 December 1990) is a Taiwanese swimmer. He competed in the men's 50 metre breaststroke event at the 2017 World Aquatics Championships. In 2019, he represented Chinese Taipei at the 2019 World Aquatics Championships held in Gwangju, South Korea. He competed in the men's 50 metre freestyle and men's 50 metre breaststroke events and in both events he did not advance to compete in the semi-finals.

References

External links
 

1990 births
Living people
Taiwanese male swimmers
Place of birth missing (living people)
Swimmers at the 2018 Asian Games
Asian Games competitors for Chinese Taipei
Taiwanese male breaststroke swimmers